Khalyan (also Romanized as Khalyān) is a village in Beradust Rural District, Sumay-ye Beradust District, Urmia County, West Azerbaijan Province, Iran. At the 2006 census, its population was 129, in 23 families.

References 

Populated places in Urmia County